is a Japanese weightlifter. He competed in the men's bantamweight event at the 2000 Summer Olympics.

References

1978 births
Living people
Japanese male weightlifters
Olympic weightlifters of Japan
Weightlifters at the 2000 Summer Olympics
Place of birth missing (living people)
Weightlifters at the 2002 Asian Games
Asian Games competitors for Japan
21st-century Japanese people